This is a recap of the 2000 season for the Professional Bowlers Association (PBA) Tour.  It was the tour's 42nd season, and consisted of 19 events.

Norm Duke had three titles in the shortened season, including a major at the PBA National Championship, helping him win PBA Player of the Year honors.

Bowling's U.S. Open was won by Robert Smith for his first-ever title. The ABC Masters title went to Finnish bowler Mika Koivuniemi, while Jason Couch captured his second straight Brunswick World Tournament of Champions title.

An oddity of the season saw Chris Barnes lead every statistical category except earnings, despite setting a record by making 12 final-round appearances without a win.  In other news this season, the PBA was sold to three former Microsoft executives in April, who planned to make the PBA a for-profit business. Former Nike marketing executives Steve Miller and Ian Hamilton were named President and Commissioner, respectively.

Tournament schedule

References

External links
2000 Season Schedule

Professional Bowlers Association seasons
2000 in bowling